Next is a brand of cigarettes, currently owned and manufactured by Philip Morris International. The original acronym for Next was a reference to "nicotine extracted".

History
The brand was launched in 1989 by Philip Morris USA as a "low-nicotine" brand in the United States they dubbed as "de-nic". The company claimed that Next was better than other low-nicotine varieties because its taste was indistinguishable from regular cigarettes. The nicotine was removed from the cigarettes using high-pressure carbon dioxide in a process similar to the method used by coffee companies when making decaffeinated coffee. Test marketing began in July 1989, around the time of the release of the Surgeon General's report on nicotine addiction, in three markets (Omaha, Hartford and Toledo). Philip Morris USA spent tens of millions of Dollars developing the product, but it never received any credible third-party endorsement. Instead, public health groups criticised the product because it actually had higher tar levels than many other cigarette brands, and that heavy smokers would simply smoke more Next cigarettes to give their bodies the nicotine they crave. They also petitioned the Food and Drug Administration to regulate it as a drug delivery device.

Eventually, the brand became a marketing failure once the test results proved to be disappointing due to poor sales (less than 0.2 market share) and Philip Morris stopped producing them in late 1989.

Additional test marketing of Next was conducted by Philip Morris in Tampa in May 1990, but the results were still poor and the product was pulled off the market once again.

The brand was eventually re-launched after tax increases of tobacco in Malaysia pushed Marlboro out of the market.  Next is also available in tobacco for rolling use.

Next International is sold in Canada as a discount cigarette brand which competes with other imported brands such as Viceroy, Legend, Studio and Pall Mall.

Controversy

Fraudulent practices in Morocco 
In May 2015, the Moroccan Tobacco Company (formerly Imperial Tobacco) was accused of committing fraudulent acts by mixing both blonde and brown tobacco and selling it as 100% dark tobacco.

According to the international definition, brown cigarettes must be at least 60% brown tobacco. But in Morocco, there is no standard for tobacco mixtures. To counter cheating, some distributors demand the standardization of taxation of blond and brown tobacco.

The Emirati-Morocco for Industry and Distribution had launched the marketing of Next cigarettes at 15 dirhams. Produced by the American Philip Morris, the tobacco brand was approved more than a year and a half ago by the Moroccan Tobacco Company (formerly Imperial Tobacco), which never marketed it. But what sparked industry outrage was that Next was suspected of being officially listed as brown tobacco, hence the very low price. But the product that was just launched at the point of sale advertising was rather a blend between brown tobacco and blond tobacco. This would not be consistent with what was approved by the Tobacco Control Board. Laboratory analyzes were also underway to determine the true composition of Next cigarettes. But one already suspects a strong predominance of blond tobacco. The Probate Commission, which was made up of the Ministries of Trade and Industry, Health, Agriculture and Finance, would be called in to make its own investigation and react to that.

For the introduction on the Moroccan market of Next, premium brand of brown tobacco, the distributor had chosen the southern regions of Casablanca, including Kelaâ Sraghna, Marrakesh. Areas known for the preference of Value For Money cigarettes (low cost). The distribution of the new brand was gradually being rolled out all over the country.

Contacted by The Economist, Philip Morris rejected any accusation. "The product we market is in line with what has been approved by the Commission. It is indeed a brown tobacco as authorized." said the tobacco giant. The latter recalls that most tobacco companies use tobacco blends to personalize a product and that this is a widespread trend for all operators. The controversy would not fail to intensify a week before the publication of a new list of cigarettes in the Official Bulletin, provided by the law in early June of each year.

Markets
Next was or still is sold in the following places: Canada, United States, Costa Rica, Colombia, Brazil, Argentina, Luxembourg, Belgium, Sweden, Germany, Austria, Spain, Poland, Czech Republic, Slovakia, Bulgaria, Greece, Estonia, Lithuania, Ukraine, Russia, Morocco, Israel, Pakistan, Taiwan and Hong Kong.

Products

Full flavor
Lights
Ultra Light
Menthol
Menthol Capsule
 Chill Menthol

Canada
Next Red (Full Flavour now known as Next Xtra)
Next Green (Non-Menthol as of Jan 1 2017) has a charcoal filter. (Now known as Next Smooth)
Next Blue (Light now known as Next Original)
Next Gold (Smooth now known as Next Select)
Next Noir (only available in Quebec)
Next Duo (Redesigned without Menthol Capsule) - (as of flavour ban Jan 1 2017)
Next Xpress (Full Flavour)

See also
Nicotine
Tobacco smoking
List of cigarette smoke constituents
List of additives in cigarettes

References

Philip Morris brands